Castle Bruce is a parliamentary electoral district in Dominica. It includes the areas of Castle Bruce, Good Hope, Petite Soufrière, and San Sauveur. It came into effect in time for the 1975 Dominican general election. It has been represented by Octavia Alfred of the Dominica Labour Party since the 2019 general election.

Constituency profile 
The constituency was created for the 1975 Dominican general election. It includes the areas of Castle Bruce, Good Hope, Petite Soufrière, and San Sauveur. It had an electorate of 2,850 . It extends from the eastern boundary of Saint Joseph Parish to the north, along the Madjini River to the Atlantic Ocean on the east, from the Rosalie River on the south until the intersection of the Pont Casse-Rosalie and Castle Bruce roads on the west.

Representatives 
This constituency has elected the following members of the House of Assembly of Dominica:

Election results

Elections in the 2010s

References 

Constituencies of Dominica